Calosoma arrowi is a species of ground beetle in the subfamily of Carabinae. It was described by Breuning in 1928.

References

arrowi
Beetles described in 1928